The Outcast Band are a high-energy roots-rock band from Stroud, Gloucestershire. The band have played over 500 shows to audiences from London to Berlin, at festivals including Glastonbury, Guilfest, Wychwood, Trowbridge, The Acoustic Festival of Britain, and Heineken Big Tops, as well as a 52 date UK university tour and a number of European festivals.

The Longest Mile 
In December 2009, the band met record producer Phil Tennant. He had been known for his key involvement with many successful roots bands. Having produced albums for The Levellers, The Waterboys, The Saw Doctors, The Newcranes and The Tansads, he and also went on to manage The Waterboys and discover Pixie Lott.

The band met with Tennant to discuss their plans for a new album and, having heard some demos, he agreed to become involved. Tennant and the band recorded the album, The Longest Mile, at Rockfield Studios in Wales with engineer, Adam Whittaker. The album was released in November 2010. The album is hotly anticipated by their loyal following. The first single from the album was "Orphans". This new album has been described as "an ambitious record that creates a dark and brooding atmosphere, contrasted by lighter and sweeter moments. Featuring distinctive vocals, raw folk instrumentals and fresh, poetic lyrics".

Personnel 
 Damien Kay – vocals, guitar, mandolin
 Paul Godfrey – violin, mandolin
 Tom Price - guitar, mandolin
 John Forrester - bass guitar, vocals
 Matt White - drums
 Helen Leask - Accordion, Piano, Hammond

The band are represented by Eden Music Management.

Discography 
 "10 Songs Demo" (1992 - Sticky Songs)
 "The Devil's Road" (1993 - Art & Soul OUTCD002)
 "Face The Rain" (1995 - Art & Soul OUTCD004)
 The Longest Mile (2010 - Thirsty Dog Records)

References

External links
 The Outcast Band website

British folk rock groups
British indie rock groups
People from Stroud